This is a list of the National Register of Historic Places listings in Bingham County, Idaho.

This is intended to be a complete list of the properties and districts on the National Register of Historic Places in Bingham County, Idaho, United States. Latitude and longitude coordinates are provided for many National Register properties and districts; these locations may be seen together in a map.

There are 18 properties and districts listed on the National Register in the county. More may be added; properties and districts nationwide are added to the Register weekly.

Current listings

|}

Proposed or formerly listed
Dubois Historic District, roughly bounded by E. Main, Court, S. Shilling, and Bingham Sts., Blackfoot, Idaho.  Status changed October 4, 1982, reference number 82005189.  Incorporated into Shilling Avenue Historic District, 1983.

See also

 List of National Historic Landmarks in Idaho
 National Register of Historic Places listings in Idaho

References

National Register of Historic Places in Bingham County, Idaho
Bingham